Attilia Radice (1914–1980) was an Italian ballerina at La Scala in Milan. She is remembered above all for the roles she created at the Rome Opera.

Biography

Radice studied ballet at the La Scala Theatre Ballet School under Enrico Cecchetti until he died in 1928, whereafter she continued under Lucia Fornaroli graduating in 1932. She joined the La Scala company the same year, making her début in Léonide Massine's Belkis. She danced in the ballets of the 1930s including Franco Vittadini's Vecchia Milano and Riccardo Pick-Mangiagalli's Il carillon magico. Thanks to her elegant, expressive style, she soon became the Scala's prima ballerina. 

From 1935 to 1957, she danced in the Rome Opera Ballet as prima ballerina assoluta with principal dancer Guido Lauri as her partner. Radice created roles in works choreographed by Aurel Milloss including Bolero and The Miraculous Mandarin. 
After retiring from the company in 1957, she became director of the ballet school until 1975, where she was effective in adopting Cecchetti's approach.

Attilia Radice died in Capranica on 14 September 1980.

Major roles

Radice is remembered for her roles in the following ballets choreographed by Aurel Milloss:
1939: Petrushka
1940: The Creatures of Prometheus
1940: The Rite of Spring
1941: The Prodigal Son
1943: Bolero
1947: Orpheus
1956: Estro arguto

References

1914 births
1980 deaths
Italian ballerinas
People from Taranto
Prima ballerinas